, officially abbreviated as  in Japan, is a Japanese light novel series written by Hirotaka Akagi and illustrated by Eito Shimotsuki. Shogakukan published eleven volumes under their Gagaga Bunko imprint. A manga adaptation titled  with art by Yuzuki N' was serialized in Mag Garden's shōnen manga magazine Monthly Comic Blade from March 2014 to February 2016. An anime television series adaptation by J.C.Staff aired from July to September 2015.  is a Japanese word for "vulgar slang", "dirty joke," "blue joke," or "erotic topic."

Plot
In the dystopian future of 2030, the Japanese government is cracking down on any perceived immoral activity from using risqué language to distributing lewd materials in the country, to the point where all citizens are forced to wear high-tech devices called Peace Makers (PM) at all times that analyze every spoken word and hand motions for any action that could break the law. A new high school student named Tanukichi Okuma enters the country's leading elite "public morals school" to reunite with his crush and student council president, Anna Nishikinomiya. However, Tanukichi quickly finds himself entwined with the perverted terrorist "Blue Snow" ("Tundra's Blue" in some translations) when she kidnaps and forces him to join her organization, "SOX", in creating and spreading pornographic material across the city as a form of protest against the regulations.

Characters

Tanukichi is the son of an infamous dirty joke terrorist named Zenjuro, who was arrested by the Japanese moral authorities years ago after trying to spread condoms around the Diet building in defiance of the moral laws. He graduated from a public intermediate school with the "lowest morals score" according to his classmates. He finds himself constantly torn between keeping the secret of Ayame's alter-ego as a lewd terrorist and turning her in to the authorities to win Anna's favor.

 

The vice-president of the student council and daughter of a disgraced former Diet member who unsuccessfully fought against the public morality laws. Ayame secretly acts outside of school as the perverted terrorist "Blue Snow", wearing panties over her face, spreading semi-pornographic leaflets, and shouting dirty jokes in defiance of the Japanese moral authorities. After kidnapping Tanukichi, she decides to form the group SOX with him and expand her activities to include the school and beyond. Her father taught her a code she can use on her mobile phone that disables the collars and PMs she wears for three minutes per day allowing her to freely say or do any lewd things during the time.

Student council president and Tanukichi's childhood crush who has tasked him with hunting down Blue Snow before she can endanger the morals of the school. After being accidentally kissed by Tanukichi, she develops an obsessive yandere-like love for him. However, due to lack of knowledge on "immoral" subjects, she ends up expressing her love in extreme ways. She exhibits extreme amounts of superhuman strength, speed and dexterity, especially when angered or motivated.

An artistic prodigy whose paintings have won awards and are even displayed throughout the school, though she seems bored by the attention. After inadvertently discovering Tanukichi changing out of a Blue Snow costume, she blackmails him into being her "pet" for a while, and later joins SOX in order to learn how to draw explicit artwork after being educated on the subject by Ayame. Because her PM is able to detect any lewd movement her hands make, she instead taught herself to draw by holding tools with her mouth to avoid its sensor.

A budding scientist and classmate of Tanukichi who is obsessed with solving the mystery behind how babies are truly conceived, as the Japanese moral authorities have censored everything pertaining to sex education beyond vague generalities. She even went so far as to constantly visit gynecology clinics and hospitals in order to learn more until she was banned from visiting them. Often collects insects to study their reproductive habits. She has a very sharp sense of observation. Though not officially a member of SOX, she helps them out from time to time because she is aware (to some degree) of the identities of its members.

Treasurer of the student council with a posture and demeanor similar to that of a gorilla, though he hates bananas. He initially distrusted Tanukichi upon learning that he is Zenjuro's son, but later comes to respect him and care for his well-being after Tanukichi saved Anna from stalkers that attacked which left him hospitalized.

The daughter of Keisuke and a fangirl of SOX who carries multiple weapons (such as air guns and electric stuns) with her and uses tactics she learned from romantic and shōjo manga to manipulate people, even her allies. Ayame lets her join in partly because her hairstyle looks similar to the tip of a penis.

Anna's father and a National Diet member who was the driving force behind the original public morals laws that turned Japan into a "highly moral society." He uses the excuse of protecting morality to exert his control over the whole country.

Anna's mother who is behind a push for even stricter public morality laws than the currently enacted ones in order to create an ideal world that poses virtually no threat to Anna's chastity.

A school prefect trained by Matsukage to adhere to a strict moral code that mostly revolves around protecting Anna from all potentially immoral influences, including mundane items like basketball hoops and toilet paper rolls. Oboro even has this codified under "Five Provisions," which includes the caveat that Oboro cannot interfere if Anna herself exhibits lewd behavior or desires. Oboro is surprisingly quick to change position on what is considered "illegal" material when a student protests strongly enough.

The estranged father of Kosuri; ero-terrorist who made deals with the moral authorities, angering the other terrorist groups around Japan, as well as his own daughter.

 

Ero-terrorist who wraps himself in panties and is obsessed with underwear, having his own concepts of what is considered the best type of underwear. A "high-class pervert" who leads the group "Gathered Fabric" to steal all kinds of undergarments across Japan, he ends up clashing against SOX because Ayame believes him to be ruining the group's reputation by performing terrorist acts such as hijacking public transportation under the claim that Gathered Fabric is an ally of SOX.

An ero-terrorist who appears in the anime's last episode. He personally knew and worked alongside Zenjuro and planned to unlock a secret vault filled with erotic treasures using an artefact that was passed down to Tanukichi. He gathered the main cast to a resort via false invitations and challenged them to a duel for the artifact through Yakyuken.

An anime original character. Binkan is just an innocent bystander who is often nearby whenever SOX performs another act of ero-terrorism, staring at their latest handiwork. She is hardly acknowledged by the main characters until the final episode where it is shown that she is a prefect in training under the leadership of Oboro. Binkan's real name is never mentioned; her nickname roughly translates to "little sensitive (girl)."

Ayame's stepmother who secretly opposes the new moral laws, especially the ones against mixed bathing. Runs an old-style Japanese inn with a hot spring bath, and taught Ayame how to be a proper Japanese lady growing up.

Tanukichi's mother, nicknamed the "Fullmetal Ogress" for her tall stature and gruff demeanour. Ranko is a staunch supporter of the new moral authorities and a friend of Sophia. She taught Tanukichi how to fight and defend himself.

An American technical expert hired by the Japanese government to promote the PM technology overseas, but has a tenuous grasp of the Japanese language, leading to her often using dirty innuendo when she tries to speak it. She later becomes attracted to Tanukichi.

An old childhood friend of Tanukichi and member of a rural farmer family.

The founder and leader of the ero-terrorist group Bacon Lettuce Moms.

Media

Light novels
The first light novel volume was published on July 18, 2012 by Shogakukan under their Gagaga Bunko imprint. Eleven volumes and one extra have been published.

Manga
A manga adaptation by Yuzuki N', titled, was serialized in Mag Garden's Monthly Comic Blade from March 28, 2014 to February 5, 2016.

Anime
An anime television series adaptation was announced by Gagaga Bunko in October 2014. The series was produced by J.C.Staff and directed by Youhei Suzuki, with Masahiro Yokotani handling the scripts, Masahiro Fujii designing the characters, and Akiyuki Tateyama composing the music. It aired on AT-X, Tokyo MX, KBS, CTC and other channels from July 4 to September 19, 2015. SOX performed the opening theme "B Chiku Sentai SOX", while Sumire Uesaka performed the ending theme "Inner Urge". 

Funimation licensed the series in North America. In Australia and New Zealand, the series is licensed by Madman Entertainment, who simulcasted the series on AnimeLab.

Notes

References

External links
Anime official website 
Shimoneta to Iu Gainen ga Sonzai Shinai Taikutsu na Sekai: Man**-hen at Mag Garden Comic Online 

2012 Japanese novels
Anime and manga based on light novels
AT-X (TV network) original programming
Crunchyroll anime
Dystopian anime and manga
Gagaga Bunko
Shogakukan franchises
J.C.Staff
Light novels
Mag Garden manga
School life in anime and manga
Sex comedy anime and manga
Shōnen manga
Terrorism in fiction
Works about censorship
Works about terrorism